Don Greenwood Jr. (September 26, 1928 – June 27, 1990) was an American set decorator. He was nominated for an Academy Award in the category Best Art Direction for the film How the West Was Won.

Selected filmography
 How the West Was Won (1962)

References

External links

1928 births
1990 deaths
American set decorators